Secret Name is the fourth studio album by American indie rock band Low. It was released in 1999, their first album on the Kranky record label. The album was recorded by Steve Albini at Electrical Audio in Chicago.

Bass guitarist Zak Sally plays an Optigan on some tracks. The album title comes from the "Weight of Water" lyric: "Make a river through the sand, 'Til you're called by a secret name."

Critical reception
The A.V. Club called the album "a consistently striking, resonant collection." The Washington Post wrote that "Low has accomplished something new without neglecting the serenity that initially made its music distinctive."

Track listing

References

Low (band) albums
Kranky albums
Albums produced by Steve Albini